The High Commissioner of Australia to New Zealand is an officer of the Australian Department of Foreign Affairs and Trade and the head of the High Commission of the Commonwealth of Australia to New Zealand in Wellington. The High Commissioner has the rank and status of an Ambassador Extraordinary and Plenipotentiary and is currently Harinder Sidhu since 31 March 2022, who also has responsibility for Tokelau in the Realm of New Zealand, as well as the Pitcairn Islands, an overseas territory of the United Kingdom. Accreditation was previously held for the Cook Islands and Niue, states in free association as part of the Realm of New Zealand, which now have resident Australian high commissions since March 2020 and August 2020, respectively.

The posting is one of Australia's oldest, with the first High Commissioner appointed in 1943, although it dates much earlier to 1934 when an Australian Government Trade Commissioner was appointed to Wellington. There is also a Consulate-General and Trade Commission in Auckland maintained by Austrade since 1955.

Posting history

The first official Australian representation in New Zealand dates back to March 1934, when the Commonwealth government of Joseph Lyons as part of its policy of expanding trade connections in the Asia-Pacific region, appointed prominent businessman Robert Henry Nesbitt, as the first Trade Commissioner of Australia in New Zealand. Nesbitt's appointment followed from the signing of a trade agreement between the two countries on 7 April 1933, which was ratified by the parliament on 10 November 1933. To be stationed in the city of Wellington, the government also appointed a senior public servant from the Department of the Interior as assistant trade commissioner, James Payne. Nesbitt commenced his position on 29 August 1934, arriving in Wellington aboard the Huddart Parker liner, MS Wanganella, and setting up offices in the DIC Building in Lambton Quay. Nesbitt served until 15 April 1937, when he was appointed as Chairman of the Milk Board of New South Wales.

With Nesbitt's departure, in July 1937 the Australian Government appointed the Trade Commissioner in Batavia, Dutch East Indies, Charles Edward Critchley, as the next Trade Commissioner in Wellington. Critchley took over from acting commissioner Payne on 6 December 1937 when he arrived in Wellington aboard the Union Company liner, TSS Awatea. Critchley's assistant trade commissioner was also named in November 1937, with the brother of (then attorney-general) Robert Menzies, James Leslie Menzies, appointed. In March 1941, Critchley was appointed Assistant Controller General of Food and was recalled to Australia in April 1941, with Menzies serving as acting trade commissioner and Australia's de facto official representative in New Zealand.

By 1942, the governments in Canberra and Wellington had decided upon upgrading their respective representatives to the level of high commissioner. In March 1943, Carl Berendsen was appointed as the first high commissioner of New Zealand in Australia, and in November 1943 the Minister for External Affairs, Herbert Evatt, appointed the Deputy Premier of Tasmania, Thomas d'Alton, as Australia's first high commissioner to New Zealand.

In 1955, a separate Australian Trade Commission posting was established in the city of Auckland, with Benjamin Dawson serving as the first Trade Commissioner. The trade commission in Auckland was upgraded to a consulate-general from 1 August 1975. A trade commissioner was also appointed to the city of Christchurch from 1957 to 1979.

Cook Islands and Niue

In 1994, Australia formally established diplomatic relations with the Cook Islands, a self-governing state since 1974 in free association with New Zealand, with the high commissioner in Wellington also serving as high commissioner to the Cook Islands. In November 2018, Prime Minister Scott Morrison announced an expansion of Australia's diplomatic representation to all members of the Pacific Islands Forum, including opening a new high commission in the Cook Islands and Niue. On 18 December 2019, Foreign Minister Marise Payne. announced the establishment of a resident Australian High Commission in the Cook Islands to "help underscore Australia’s focus on deepening engagement across the region." The first resident high commissioner, Christopher Watkins, took office in Rarotonga on 17 March 2020.

On 27 February 2014 Australia formally established diplomatic relations with Niue, a self-governing state since 1974 in free association with New Zealand, with the high commissioner in Wellington also serving as high commissioner to Niue. The first resident high commissioner, Susan Allen, took office in Alofi on 26 August 2020.

Heads of mission

Notes
 Also non-resident High Commissioner to the Cook Islands, 1994–2020.
 Also non-resident High Commissioner to Niue, 2014–2020.

Consuls-General in Auckland

See also
Australia–New Zealand relations
List of New Zealand High Commissioners to Australia

References

External links

Australian High Commission, New Zealand
Australian High Commission, Cook Islands
Australian High Commission, Niue

 
New Zealand
Foreign relations of Australia
Australia
Australia and the Commonwealth of Nations
New Zealand and the Commonwealth of Nations